Katydid is the common name for insects of the family Tettigoniidae, including
Pseudophyllinae, a subfamily of Tettigoniidae
Pterophylla camellifolia - a katydid species with the common name of "common true katydid"

Katydid may also refer to:
Katydids (band), an English pop and rock band
USS Katydid (SP-95), a United States navy patrol boat
McDonnell TD2D Katydid, a United States navy target drone
Denison Katydids, a minor league baseball team
A pseudonym used by Kate Slaughter McKinney

See also
Katydid sequence, a number sequence
Katydid Books, a publisher